The 2011 Russian Cup was held in Yekaterinburg, Russia, from 15-21 August 2011.

Medalists

References

Cup of Russia in artistic gymnastics
2011 in gymnastics
Russian Cup